The Song of the Sibyl is a liturgical drama and a Gregorian chant, the lyrics of which comprise a prophecy describing the Apocalypse, which has been performed in churches on Majorca (Balearic Islands, Spain) and Alghero (Sardinia, Italy), and some Catalan churches, in the Catalan language on Christmas Eve nearly uninterruptedly since medieval times. It was declared a Masterpiece of the Oral and Intangible Heritage of Humanity by UNESCO on 16 November 2010.

Versions
Several versions, differing in text and music, exist. 
Latin Sibyl, from 10th-11th century, which incorporates fragments of The City of God (XVIII, 23) by St. Augustine
Provençal Sibyl, from the 13th century, reflecting influence of troubadour poetry
Catalan Sibyl. The latest and most ornamented version. Incorporates popular traditions of Balearic Islands. Refrain of this version is sometimes written for three or four voices

Origins

The author of The Song of the Sibyl is unknown. The prophecy was first recorded as an acrostic poem in Greek by bishop Eusebius of Caesarea and later translated into Latin by Saint Augustine in The City of God. It appeared again in the 10th century in different locations across Catalonia, Italy, Castile, and France in the sermon Contra judeos, later inserted into the reading of the sixth lesson of the second nocturn of matins and was performed as an integral part of the liturgy.

This chant was originally sung in Latin and under the name of Judicii Signum, but from the 13th on, versions in Catalan are found.

These early Catalan versions of the Judici Signum were not directly translated from Latin. Instead, they all come from a previous adaptation in Provençal, which proves the huge popularity this song must have had in the past.

Amongst the Catalan texts which come from this common root, there is a 14th-century Codex kept in the Archives of the Majorcan Diocese, which was rediscovered in 1908. Oral transmission and the lack of written scripts has caused the various old texts in the vernacular to suffer many modifications over time, which has led to a diversity of versions.

The Song of the Sibyl was almost totally abandoned throughout Europe after the Council of Trent (held in 25 sessions from 1545 to 1563) declared its performance was forbidden. Nevertheless, it was restored on Mallorca as soon as in 1575.

Music

Original Music 
Originally, the Song of the Sibyl was sung in a Gregorian melody and, as it can be seen in the codex previously mentioned, the musical accompaniment that was played in Majorca, with the exception of some variations, was the same documented in other places across the Iberian Peninsula. Today, it cannot be ascertained when the Song of the Sibyl was sung to this Gregorian melody, but most likely until the 16th or 17th century. Oral transmission of the song caused, as it did with the text, the birth of different variations and models. The interest this chant produced amongst early Musicologists and Folklorists of the 19th century led to the transcription of the different known versions of the song. The versions still played nowadays take these transcriptions as model.

In the Renaissance, the Gregorian melody of the Song was set to polyphonic music by various composers, a common practice during that period. Two of these works, both for four voices, can be found in the Cancionero de la Colombina, a Spanish manuscript from the second half of the 15th century. The text in them is an abridged version of the Song, in the Castilian language.

Present-Day Performance 

The song was originally sung by a Presbyter, although this figure was later replaced by a boy. Even though the Song is supposed to be sung by a Sibyl woman (prophetess), for many centuries women were not allowed to sing in church.

Today, in most temples in which the song is interpreted, it is still sung by a boy, although in some cases it is sung by either a little girl or a woman. In the performance, the singer walks up to the Altar escorted by two or more altar boys carrying wax candles. Once there, the singer greets the crucifix, turns around, and begins the song. The song is sung a cappella and in a solo voice. In some churches, organ music or either modern choral interludes are introduced between one verse and the next.

The costume used to perform the song is rather similar in all churches (at least around Majorca) where it is performed. It consists of a white or coloured tunic, sometimes embroidered around the neck and the hem, and usually, a cape (which is sometimes replaced with a second tunic). The head is covered with a cap of the same colour. The singer holds a sword in his hands, which is held erect during the whole song. Once the song is over, the singer draws a cross in the air with the sword, turns around to the crucifix once again, usually bows, and afterwards is escorted away from the altar by the same boys.

Today the performer is either a boy or a girl, and increasingly more places in the Catalan-speaking world are taking up the tradition again, such that in 2010, it will be performed not only in the majority of municipalities on Mallorca and in L'Alguer (Sardinia), but also in the following municipalities of Catalonia and the Valencian Country: Barcelona (at 3 different churches), Gandia, Lleida, Ontinyent, Sueca, Vic and others.

Lyrics 

The song starts with an introduction, the melody of which differs from the rest of the song. In some performances, the song ends with the introductory melody as well.

The lyrics stated here correspond with a Majorcan version of the song. For the Alguer version of the song, see Cant de la Sibil·la (L'Alguer) on Wikisource. The text is not standard, but late Medieval Catalan. Some verses are attributed to the 14th-century Mallorcan writer, Anselm Turmeda, who translated into Catalan the Judicii Signum (Book of the Final Judgement), on which the composition is based.

The lyrics used on Mallorca are as follows:

Original Latin  
Judicii signum tellus sudore madescet.

Et celo rex adveniet per secla futurus
Scilicet in carne presens ut judicet orbem.

Judicii signum tellus sudore madescet.

Reicient simulacra viri cunctam quoque gazam
Exuret terras ignis pontumque polumque.

Judicii signum tellus sudore madescet.

Inquirens tetri portas esfringet averni
Sanctorum sed enim cuncte lux libera carni.

Judicii signum tellus sudore madescet.

Eripitur solis jubar et choris interit astris
Solvetur celum lunaris splendor obibit.

Judicii signum tellus sudore madescet.

Et coram hic domino reges sistentur ad unum
Decidet et celo ignis et sulphuris amnis.

Recordings 
An excerpt of the Latin version was recorded in 1974 by The Boston Camerata, directed by Joel Cohen, in their album "A Medieval Christmas" (Nonesuch), and again in their 1990 album "New Britain: The Roots of American Folksong" (Erato/Warner Classics), with an American Judgement Day hymn as comparison.

In 1994 a full Latin text with choral accompaniment was recorded by Brigitte Lesne and her group Discantus on the CD "Campus Stellae" (Opus 111).

A medieval variant in Galician-Portuguese from the Cantigas of Alfonso del Sabio (Madre de Deus) was recorded in 1987 by The Boston Camerata, directed by Joel Cohen, in their album "The Sacred Bridge" (Erato),  and again in 2006 in the same ensemble's "A Mediterranean Christmas."

A sixteenth-century French song, "Oiez, seigneurs,"  with similar text (but different music) can be found on "Noël Noël: French Christmas Music" by The Boston Camerata, directed by Joel Cohen (Erato/Warner Classics)

A Catalan version was recorded by Maria del Mar Bonet in 1979 on her album Saba de terrer, and by the vocal ensemble Obsidienne in 1995. The Song of the Sibyl (in all versions) was recorded in 1988 by Jordi Savall and Montserrat Figueras. A part of it is also performed by Dead Can Dance on their album Aion (1990) and live album Toward the Within (1994).

A traditional Majorca version was recorded in 2014 by Cappela an a cappella group of singers from Barcelona, Spain, in their album Cappela Per Nadal.

References

External links

Books
 Francesc Vicens: El cant de la Sibil·la a Mallorca
 Maricarmen Gómez Muntané: El Canto de la Sibila I. León y Castilla II. Cataluña y Baleares. Alpuerto. Madrid. 1996-1997 
 La Sibila. Sonido. Imagen. Liturgia. Escena. Maricarmen Gómez & Eduardo Carrero. Alpuerto. Madrid. 2015
 Sadurní Martí: "El viaje textual de la Sibila, entre Occitania y Cataluña", en El Juicio Final: Sonido. Imagen. Liturgia. Escena, ed. Maricarmen Gómez Muntané. Madrid: Alpuerto, 2017, p. 217-249..

Webs 
 The Song of the Sibyl at the romanesque wall paintings of the St. Roman Church of Toledo (Spain, s.XIII) (Spanish) 
 Webs about the Sibyl Chant - in Catalan
 The Sibyl Chant - Catalan
 Declaration of Inmaterial Good of Cultural Interest - Annexus - Spanish Ministry of Commerce, Tourism, and Industry - Spanish

Video
 The Song of the Sibyl at the Cathedral of Majorca in 2007
 The Song of the Sibyl at the Cathedral of Mallorca in 2009
 The Song of the Sibyl at the church of Cala Rajada, on Mallorca, sung by an adult here: Bàrbara Femenies, with Antònia Gomis on the organ, 2007.
 The Song of the Sibyl, Santa Maria del Mar, Barcelona, December 24th, 2009
 The Song of the Sibyl at the Cathedral of Valencia in 2017

Audio
 Whole version - RealAudio (Blavets de Lluc)
 Fragment - MP3 (Blavets de Lluc)

Catalan-language songs
Latin-language Christian hymns
Masterpieces of the Oral and Intangible Heritage of Humanity
Year of song unknown